Ivars Timermanis (born February 4, 1982) is a retired Latvian professional basketball player who played the Small forward position.

Pro career
He was a member of the Latvian national basketball team. He has played in various teams in Latvia and Germany, such as BK Ventspils, Barons LMT  and Eisbären Bremerhaven in German Basketball Bundesliga. After playing half of the 2010-11 season with BC Rakvere Tarvas, he joined Ukrainian club BC Cherkasy the next season. In the 2012-13 season he joined CSU Asesoft where he won the Romanian championship.

In September 2014, Timermanis announced his retirement.

Honours
2003-04 Latvian League (BK Ventspils)
2004-05 Latvian League (BK Ventspils)
2005-06 Latvian League (BK Ventspils)
2009-10 Latvian League (Barons LMT)
2012-13 Romanian League (CSU Asesoft Ploiesti)

References

External links
 Ivars Timermanis at eurocupbasketball.com

1982 births
Living people
BC Cherkaski Mavpy players
Korvpalli Meistriliiga players
Latvian men's basketball players
Latvian expatriate basketball people in Germany
Latvian expatriate basketball people in Estonia
Eisbären Bremerhaven players
People from Bauska
BC Rakvere Tarvas players
Small forwards